This is an inclusive list of science fiction television programs whose names begin with the letter K.

K
Live-action
Kamen Rider (franchise):
Kamen Rider (1971–1973, Japan)
Kamen Rider X (1974, Japan)
Kamen Rider Amazon (1974–1975, Japan)
Kamen Rider Stronger (1975, Japan)
Kamen Rider (Skyrider) (1979–1980, Japan)
Kamen Rider Super-1 (1980–1981, Japan)
Birth of the 10th! Kamen Riders All Together!! (1984, Japan)
Kamen Rider Black (1987–1988, Japan)
Kamen Rider Black RX (1988–1989, Japan)
Kamen Rider Kuuga (2000–2001, Japan)
Kamen Rider Agito (2001–2002, Japan)
Kamen Rider Ryuki (2002–2003, Japan)
Kamen Rider 555 (2003–2004, Japan)
Kamen Rider Blade (2004–2005, Japan)
Kamen Rider Hibiki (2005–2006, Japan)
Kamen Rider Kabuto (2006–2007, Japan)
Kamen Rider Den-O (2007–2008, Japan)
Kamen Rider Kiva (2008–2009, Japan)
Kamen Rider Decade (2009, Japan)
Kamen Rider G (2009, Japan, special)
Masked Rider (1995–1996, Kamen Rider Black RX US adaptation)
Kamen Rider: Dragon Knight (2009, US, adaptation)
Kamen Rider W a.k.a. Kamen Rider Double (2009–2010, Japan)
Kamen Rider OOO (2010–2011, Japan)
Kamen Rider Fourze (2011–2012, Japan)
Kamen Rider Wizard (2012–2013, Japan)
Kamen Rider Gaim (2013–2014, Japan)
Kamen Rider Drive (2014–2015, Japan)
Kamen Rider Ghost (2015–2016, Japan)
Kappatoo (1990, UK)
Kenny Starfighter (1997, Sweden)
Kids from OWL, The (1985, New Zealand)
Killjoys (2015–2019, Canada)
Kinvig (1981, UK)
Knight Rider (franchise):
Knight Rider (1982–1986)
Knight Rider 2000 (1991, film)
Knight Rider 2010 (1994, film)
Team Knight Rider (1997–1998, Knight Rider 1982 spin-off)
Knight Rider (2008, pilot, film)
Knight Rider (2008–2009)
Knights of God (1987, UK)
Krofft Supershow, The (1976–1978) (franchise):
Dr. Shrinker (1976–1977)
Electra Woman and Dyna Girl (1976–1977)
Kyle XY (2006–2009)

Animated
Kaijudo: Rise of the Duel Masters (2012–2013, animated) (elements of science fiction)
Kiddy Grade (2002–2003, Japan, animated)
Kino's Journey (2003, Japan, animated)
Knights of Sidonia (2014–2015, Japan, animated)
Kong: The Animated Series (2000–2001, animated) (elements of science fiction)

References

Television programs, K